Oleksandr Nedovyesov was the defending champion, but decided not to compete.

Marsel İlhan won the title, defeating Michael Berrer in the final, 7–6(8–6), 6–3.

Seeds

Draw

Finals

Top half

Bottom half

References
 Main Draw
 Qualifying Draw

Kazan Kremlin Cup - Singles
2014 Singles
2014 in Russian tennis